Strike Command, a military formation, can mean either:
Air Force Global Strike Command, a major command of the United States Air Force
RAF Strike Command (1968-2007)
United States Strike Command (1961-1972)